Woodland is an unincorporated community and census-designated place (CDP) in Allegany County, Maryland, United States. As of the 2010 census it had a population of 113.

Woodland started as a coal town sometime around the beginning of the 20th century. Many years ago, the town had a community church and a convenience store. Both buildings have since been converted into residences.

Demographics

References

Census-designated places in Allegany County, Maryland
Census-designated places in Maryland
Coal towns in Maryland